Cui Shiyuan (c. 1806−1869) was a Chinese poet and painter of the Qing Dynasty. He was from Xian County, Cang Prefecture, Hebei.

References

1806 births
1869 deaths
Painters from Hebei
Poets from Hebei
Qing dynasty painters
Qing dynasty poets
People from Cangzhou